Karen A. McCrimmon  (born 1959) is a Canadian Forces veteran, mediator, and politician who was elected Member of Parliament for Kanata—Carleton in the 2015 Canadian federal election. After a 31-year military career, McCrimmon retired as a lieutenant colonel. She was the first female navigator and the first woman to command a Canadian Forces air force squadron. She became involved in federal politics with the Liberal Party of Canada in 2008. In 2011, McCrimmon was the Liberal candidate for the federal election in the Carleton—Mississippi Mills riding and, in 2013, she unsuccessfully bid for the Liberal leadership. In August 2021, she announced that she would retire from politics and did not seek re-election.

Background
McCrimmon was born in Weston, Ontario. Her father, Charles Martin, was a metallurgic technician employed by the A.V. Roe Company working on the Avro Arrow CF-105 fighter aircraft. Her mother, Isabel, emigrated from Scotland on her own, at the age of 20. When the Arrow project was cancelled in 1959, her father found work with Trans-Canada Airlines and moved his family to Timmins, Ontario. In 1971, the family moved to Windsor, Ontario.

While in high school, McCrimmon joined the Royal Canadian Army Cadets. In 1975, she joined The Windsor Regiment (RCAC) as a Reservist. She graduated with a Bachelor of Arts from the University of Windsor in Russian and linguistics, and originally wanted to work in Canada's diplomatic corps.

McCrimmon then joined the Regular Force in 1980 and became an air navigator, the first female to gain such a qualification.

In 1995, she was made a member of the Order of Military Merit and, in 1998, was promoted lieutenant-colonel and given command of 429 Transport Squadron, becoming the first woman to command a Canadian Forces flying squadron. In 2000, she headed the Transport and Rescue Standardization and Evaluation Team. In July 2006, she was posted to Ramstein, Germany to serve as a Senior Staff Officer at the NATO Air Headquarters. She did a tour of duty in Afghanistan in 2004 where she was responsible for NATO Airlift Co-ordination. She retired from the Forces in 2006.

Politics 
McCrimmon became involved in federal politics with the Liberal Party in 2008. She was the Liberal candidate for the riding of Carleton—Mississippi Mills in the 2011 federal election, but lost to the Conservative incumbent Gordon O'Connor. In December 2012, she announced her bid for the leadership of the Liberal Party of Canada and, on April 14, 2013, she conceded to the winner Justin Trudeau.

In the 2015 Canadian federal election, McCrimmon was the Liberal candidate in Kanata—Carleton, essentially the Ottawa portion of Carleton—Mississippi Mills. She defeated Conservative candidate Walter Pamic by a 7,600-vote margin as the Liberals swept to a majority government.

McCrimmon was reelected in 2019, defeating Conservative candidate Justina McCaffrey by a 4,000-vote margin as the Liberals won a minority government. McCrimmon was Chair of the Defence Committee in the 43rd Canadian Parliament.

Civilian career 
On November 13, 2015, McCrimmon was sworn in as the Member of Parliament for the riding of Kanata – Carleton.  Prior to her election, she was a consultant for private and public institutions and organizations.

Married to Rob McCrimmon since 1985, the couple have two grown children. Karen McCrimmon is a private pilot and is a member of the Women's Executive Network (WXN), CFUW, FMWC, Royal Canadian Legion, and CWIA.

Honours and decorations

McCrimmon received the following honours and decorations during her military career.

Electoral record

References

External links 

1959 births
Canadian Army officers
Women members of the House of Commons of Canada
Liberal Party of Canada leadership candidates
Liberal Party of Canada MPs
Members of the House of Commons of Canada from Ontario
Living people
Politicians from Ottawa
Officers of the Order of Military Merit (Canada)
Canadian female military personnel
Women in Ontario politics
21st-century Canadian politicians
21st-century Canadian women politicians